Lawrence, Laurence or Larry Manning may refer to:

Laurence Manning, the science fiction writer whose name sometimes appeared with the more common spelling
Lawrence Manning, developer of SmoothWall
Larry Manning, NASCAR driver
Laurence Manning Academy in Manning, South Carolina

See also
John Lawrence Manning, 65th governor of South Carolina